Zierenberg is a town in the district of Kassel, in Hesse, Germany. It is located 19 km east of Bad Arolsen, and 15 km northwest of Kassel on the German Timber-Frame Road.

Local council
The elections from 06. March 2016 showed the following results:
 CDU    = 8 seats
 SPD    = 14 seats
 FDP    = 2 seats
 UFW    = 7 seats

Mayors
 Conrad Brede: 1856–1880
 Karl Kupferschläger: 1880–1911
 Wiegand Pitz: 1912–1933
 Wilhelm Schäfer: 1933–1945
 Heinrich Ledderhose: 1945–1948
 Konrad Bürgel: 1948–1956
 Rudi Walther: 1957–1972
 Georg Hildebrandt: 1972–1984
 Horst Buchhaupt: 1984–1990
 Jürgen Pfütze: 1991–2008
 Stefan Denn: 2009–2020
 since 2020: Rüdiger Gemeroth

Notable people
Johann Jacob Friedrich Krebs, fraktur painter

References

External links
 Official Webpage

Towns in Hesse
Kassel (district)